Benjamin Roberts-Smith  (born 1 November 1978) is an Australian businessman and a former Australian Army soldier. The Victoria Cross (VC) in 2011 and the Medal for Gallantry (MG) in 2006 made Roberts-Smith the most highly decorated serving member of the Australian Defence Force. He was also awarded a Commendation for Distinguished Service for leadership as a patrol commander in 2012.

Roberts-Smith left the full-time army in 2013 and studied business at the University of Queensland. In 2015, he was appointed deputy general manager of the regional television network Seven Queensland. He was subsequently promoted to general manager of the regional network and of metropolitan station Seven Brisbane.

In 2017, Roberts-Smith's actions in Afghanistan came under scrutiny in light of an independent war crimes inquiry into "questions of unlawful conduct concerning (Australia's) Special Operations Task Group in Afghanistan". In November 2018, the Australian Federal Police launched an investigation into Roberts-Smith over allegations he committed war crimes in Afghanistan. With assistance from a legal team hired by Seven Network owner Kerry Stokes, Roberts-Smith commenced defamation proceedings in August 2018 against Nine Entertainment publications The Age, The Sydney Morning Herald and The Canberra Times, and also named each of the three journalists involved in reporting alleged incidents. The trial commenced in June 2021 in the Federal Court in Sydney.

Early life and family
Roberts-Smith was born on 1 November 1978 in Perth, Western Australia. He is the elder son of Sue and Len Roberts-Smith, a former justice of the Supreme Court of Western Australia. He graduated from Hale School in 1995. His brother, Sam, is an opera singer.

Military career

Roberts-Smith joined the Australian Army in 1996 at age 18. After completing basic training at Blamey Barracks in Kapooka, New South Wales, he underwent initial employment training at the School of Infantry at Lone Pine Barracks in Singleton, New South Wales. From there, Roberts-Smith was posted to the 3rd Battalion, Royal Australian Regiment (3 RAR) in Holsworthy, New South Wales. Initially part of a rifle company, he subsequently became a section leader in the Direct Fire Support Weapons Platoon. With 3 RAR, Roberts-Smith was deployed to East Timor twice, the first time as part of the International Force East Timor in 1999.

After completing the Special Air Service Regiment (SASR) selection course in 2003, and the SASR reinforcement cycle, Roberts-Smith was initially posted to 3 Squadron at Campbell Barracks (Western Australia). He took part in operations off Fiji in 2004, and was part of personal security detachments in Iraq throughout 2005 and 2006. Roberts-Smith was deployed to Afghanistan on six occasions; the first two were in 2006 and 2007. After completing junior leadership training in 2009, he was posted to 2 Squadron as a patrol 2IC, and later as a patrol commander. Roberts-Smith was a member of training and assistance teams throughout Southeast Asia. He returned to Afghanistan in 2009, 2010 and 2012.

In 2011, Roberts-Smith noted that he—and the ADF—expected him to be able to continue to fight as a frontline patrol commander following the receipt of the Victoria Cross. He said that "[O]nce you reach patrol commander, that is the pinnacle for an SAS operator. You are now the man." He left the full-time army in 2013 at age 35 with the rank of corporal, and served part-time with the Army Reserve until 2015.

Several serving members of the SASR have spoken in Roberts-Smith's ongoing defamation trial regarding alleged bullying and threats made by Roberts-Smith during his service both within Australia and Afghanistan. "Person 1", a serving SASR member, alleged that Roberts-Smith had stated to him he would "put a bullet in the back of his head" if he didn't improve his performance. Following this, Person 1 was advised by other members to report Roberts-Smith's threat which he did, leading to Roberts-Smith allegedly threatening him again, stating "If you’re going to make accusations cunt, you’d better have some fucking proof."  Claims regarding Roberts-Smith's bullying were also reiterated by Person 43 and Person 10, other serving members of the SASR.

Citations
The following are extracts from the citations of the Department of Defence for Roberts-Smith's two awards for gallantry.

Medal for Gallantry

Victoria Cross for Australia

Roberts-Smith was presented with the VC by the Governor-General of Australia, Quentin Bryce, at a ceremony held at Campbell Barracks in Perth on 23 January 2011.

The decision to award Roberts-Smith's VC was raised during his current ongoing defamation proceedings where it was revealed that several former and serving members of the SAS had questioned the decision to award the VC to Roberts-Smith.

Commendation for Distinguished Service
On 26 January 2014, Roberts-Smith was awarded the Commendation for Distinguished Service as part of the 2014 Australia Day Honours. The award arose from a 2012 tour of Afghanistan, in which Roberts-Smith "distinguished himself as an outstanding junior leader on more than 50 high risk" operations.

A 2014 painting of Roberts-Smith, Pistol Grip by Michael Zavros, hangs in the Australian War Memorial which commissioned it. The National Portrait Gallery (Australia) commissioned a photo by Julian Kingma of Roberts-Smith in 2018. The uniform he wore in Afghanistan is also displayed in the War Memorial.

Honours and awards

Media allegations of war crimes
In October 2017, actions involving Roberts-Smith came under question again. One notable controversy concerned the killing of an alleged Taliban spotter during the 2006 battle of Chora Pass. According to the journalist Chris Masters, two members of the patrol had witnessed a lone Afghan teenager approaching the patrol observation post, leaving shortly thereafter. Although the two operators had decided it was not necessary to engage the Afghan, Roberts-Smith and patrol 2IC Matthew Locke arrived on-scene and the pair "decided to hunt down and shoot dead the two 'enemy' after concluding they had spotted the patrol".

The patrol report had identified only a single Afghan unarmed "spotter", but Roberts-Smith later said that two armed insurgents had approached the position in an oral account provided to the Australian War Memorial. When the inconsistency was raised, Roberts-Smith claimed to have remembered incorrectly.

Following the publication of No Front Line in October 2017, Fairfax Media's Nick McKenzie and the ABC's Dan Oakes covered the story—linking the case to an ongoing Inspector-General of the Australian Defence Force inquiry into criminal misconduct on the battlefield by Australian special forces. Responding to the coverage in an interview with The Australian, Roberts-Smith described the scrutiny as "un-Australian". Oakes wrote "It's not 'un-Australian' to investigate the actions of special forces in Afghanistan".

In June 2018, a joint ABC–Fairfax investigation detailed an assault on the village of Darwan in September 2012 during which a handcuffed man was allegedly kicked off a cliff by an Australian special forces soldier nicknamed "Leonidas" after the famed Spartan king. On 6 July 2018, Fairfax Media reported that Roberts-Smith was "one of a small number of soldiers subject to investigation by an inquiry looking into the actions of Australian special forces soldiers in Afghanistan". In August 2018, Fairfax Media also reported allegations by several soldiers of being bullied by Roberts-Smith, as well as a female companion's claim that she was subjected to an act of domestic violence in Australia. Roberts-Smith has denied these allegations.

Australian Federal Police investigation into war crimes

In November 2018 the Australian Federal Police announced that they "received a referral to investigate allegations of war crimes committed by Australian soldiers during the Afghanistan conflict". The Federal Court of Australia declared in September 2020 that no charges against Roberts-Smith had been laid. In April 2021, the AFP confirmed it was also conducting a probe into allegations that Roberts-Smith had destroyed or buried evidence directly related to the ongoing investigation.

Defamation suit
In response to this series of articles, in January 2019 Roberts-Smith commenced defamation proceedings in the Federal Court against Fairfax Media (a subsidiary of Nine Entertainment) and two journalists, Nick McKenzie and Chris Masters, and a former journalist, David Wroe. In its truth defence, Fairfax defended its reporting as "substantially true", detailing a series of six unlawful killings alleged to have been carried out by Roberts-Smith in Afghanistan, including those in Darwan.

Kerry Stokes' private investment company Australian Capital Equity (ACE) extended Roberts-Smith a line of credit, against which he drew $1.9 million. Stokes and another director of ACE are also on the board of the Australian War Memorial (AWM). Calls have been made for Stokes, as AWM chairman, to stand down over his public and private support for soldiers accused of war crimes in Afghanistan.

In August 2020, it was reported that legal experts had raised concerns about a personal relationship between Roberts-Smith and his defamation lawyer, saying it could constitute unprofessional conduct. News Corp Australia published a photo of Roberts-Smith holding hands with the woman, who they reported was visiting him in his new apartment in Brisbane. The woman conceded that it was "unwise to spend time with him socially".

In the Federal Court, the Fairfax/Nine Entertainment lawyer Sandy Dawson claimed that Roberts-Smith and his wife had given inconsistent accounts about the status of their relationship during previous years.

On 1 September 2020, Dawson told the Federal Court that the Australian Federal Police have information, including an eyewitness, that allegedly implicates Roberts-Smith in Afghanistan war crimes. The defamation trial, expected to last for 10 weeks, commenced in June 2021 in Sydney.

The Federal Court has established an online file in view of the public interest where documents are placed when considered publicly accessible.

In April 2021, The Age published an article alleging that Roberts-Smith had attempted to cover up the alleged crimes by hiding incriminating images on a USB drive buried in his back yard, which has since been obtained by the Australian Federal Police.

A colleague of Roberts-Smith, referred to as Person 16 (identity legally protected as part of proceedings), told the court in 2022 that Roberts-Smith had shot dead an Afghan teenage prisoner, and bragged about it.

Fairfax Media’s defence against Roberts-Smith’s suit ended in early April 2022 after calling witnesses for 11 weeks.

Civilian career

In 2013, Roberts-Smith launched his own consultancy, RS Group Australia, where he advised numerous national clients across a variety of sectors in relation to corporate culture, strategic restructuring and change management. In October 2013, Roberts-Smith announced that he was leaving the full-time Army. The University of Queensland (UQ) offered him a scholarship to study a Master of Business Administration (MBA), with a view to UQ setting up a program to support other elite SAS soldiers transitioning to a corporate career. When Roberts-Smith graduated in December 2016, becoming Australia's first enlisted Victoria Cross recipient to complete a degree after receiving the honour, he said "I joined the army at 18 so I hadn't gone to university for a Bachelor degree and I didn't have the base level of business knowledge because there were many things I just hadn't been exposed to."
 
In April 2015 (twenty months prior to graduation), Roberts-Smith was appointed deputy general manager (GM) of regional television network Seven Queensland by Seven Network GM Neil Mooney, following leadership seminars for the station. Two months later, Roberts-Smith was promoted to GM Seven Queensland. In April 2016, the role of general manager of Seven Brisbane was added to his responsibilities following the resignation of former Queensland cricketer and business executive Max Walters.

During his role at Seven Queensland, Roberts-Smith was recorded expressing disdain for the business, dislike of fellow Seven executives and incredulity that he was still running Seven Queensland despite being at the center of an alleged war crimes scandal. He also expressed that he felt indebted to media mogul and Seven owner Kerry Stokes for financing his legal actions. It was alleged in February 2022 during defamation proceedings that Roberts-Smith had employed a private investigator, John McLeod, to pose as a barman during a Seven Queensland work event in order to listen to staffers at the event and discern their opinions on Roberts-Smith.

In April 2021, Roberts-Smith temporarily stepped down from his roles at Seven Queensland to focus on his defamation action against Nine media.

From 2014 to 2017, Roberts-Smith was chair of the National Australia Day Council, an Australian Government-owned social enterprise. In popular culture, he recorded "Lest We Forget" in 2015 with country music singer Lee Kernaghan for the album Spirit of the Anzacs.

Personal life
Roberts-Smith met Emma Groom in 1998 at Holsworthy Barracks, Sydney. She came from a military family. On 6 December 2003, the couple married at the University of Western Australia. In December 2020, their divorce was finalised. Their twin daughters were born in 2010. Roberts-Smith was named 2013 Australian Father of the Year by The Shepherd Centre, a not-for-profit charitable organisation. On retirement from the army in 2015, he moved to Queensland with his then wife and daughters.

In 2017–2018, Roberts-Smith had a 6-month affair with "Person 17" (identity legally protected in current court proceedings). During this period, Person 17 became pregnant. Roberts-Smith hired a private investigator to monitor Person 17 and confirm her attendance at an abortion clinic. Person 17 has accused Roberts-Smith of punching her in the face after a dinner at Parliament House in 2018. Roberts-Smith denies ever striking her. Person 17 also accused Roberts-Smith of coaching her on how to explain a black eye resulting from the alleged assault.

In January 2022, Roberts-Smith was ordered to pay the legal costs of his ex-wife after unsuccessfully trying to sue her in the Federal Court over allegations she accessed confidential emails.

References

External links

1978 births
Military personnel from Western Australia
Australian Army soldiers
Australian military personnel of the International Force for East Timor
Australian military personnel of the Iraq War
Australian military personnel of the War in Afghanistan (2001–2021)
Australian recipients of the Victoria Cross
Living people
People educated at Hale School
People from Perth, Western Australia
Recipients of the Commendation for Distinguished Service
Recipients of the Medal for Gallantry
Recipients of the Unit Citation for Gallantry
Recipients of the Meritorious Unit Citation
University of Queensland alumni